Vinos de Calidad Preferente is a wine classification system for Uruguayan wine. 
It was established by the Uruguayan government in 1993 by the  283/993 decree.
VCP wines are made from vitis vinifera grapes, vinified to  8.6% to 15% ABV. VCP wines must be sold in glass wine bottles in the quantity  750ml or smaller.

References

Uruguayan wine
Wine classification
Food law